John Sinclair (18 September 1843 – 18 July 1925) was a notable New Zealand carpenter, builder, station manager and harbourmaster. He was born in Olrig, Caithness, Scotland in 1843.

References

1843 births
1925 deaths
Carpenters
Scottish emigrants to New Zealand
People from Caithness
New Zealand builders